The 2011 South Dakota State Jackrabbits football team represented South Dakota State University in the 2011 NCAA Division I FCS football season. The Jackrabbits were led by 14th year head coach John Stiegelmeier and played their home games at Coughlin–Alumni Stadium. They are a member of the Missouri Valley Football Conference. They finished the season 5–6, 4–4 in MVFC play to finish in a tie for fourth place.

Schedule

References

South Dakota State
South Dakota State Jackrabbits football seasons
South Dakota State Jackrabbits football